This is a list of presidential trips made by Vladimir Putin. During his presidency, which began with his inauguration on May 7, 2000, he has traveled to 50 countries as of March 2008, in addition to many more trips made domestically.

Acting presidency (December 31, 1999–May 6, 2000)

First presidency (2000–2008)

2000

The following are the international trips made by President Putin in 2000:

2001

The following are the international trips made by President Putin in 2001:

2002
The following are the international trips made by President Putin in 2002:

2003
The following are the international trips made by President Putin in 2003:

2004
The following are the international trips made by President Putin in 2004:

2005
The following are the international trips made by Putin in 2005:

2006
The following are the international trips made by Putin in 2006:

2007
The following are the international trips made by President Putin in 2007:

2008
The following are the international trips made by President Putin in 2008:

Second presidency (2012–present)

2012
The following are the international trips made by President Putin in 2012:

2013
The following are the international trips made by Putin in 2013:

2014
The following are the international trips made by President Putin in 2014:

2015

The following are the international trips made by President Putin in 2015:

2016
The following are the international trips made by President Putin in 2016:

2017
The following are the international trips made by President Putin in 2017:

2018

The following are the international trips made by Putin in 2018:

2019
The following are the international trips made by Putin in 2019:

2020
The following are the international trips made by Putin in 2020:

2021

The following are the international trips made by President Putin in 2021:

2022
The following are the international trips made by President Putin in 2022:

2023
The following are the international trips made by President Putin in 2023:

Multilateral meetings 

Vladimir Putin is scheduled to attend the following summits as Russian president.

See also
List of international presidential trips made by Dmitry Medvedev
List of international presidential trips made by Boris Yeltsin
List of international trips made by Mikhail Gorbachev

Notes

References

External links
 Travels of the Putin Presidency in Kremlin.ru archive in the 1st and the 2nd his term as president.

International presidential trips
Articles containing video clips
Lists of 21st-century trips
Diplomatic visits from Russia
Lists of diplomatic visits by heads of state
Putin
Diplomatic visits by heads of state